Khaled Benmahdi (born 22 October 1988) is a male Algerian middle-distance runner competing primarily in the 800 metres. He represented his country at the 2015 World Championships in Beijing without advancing from the first round.

His personal bests in the event are 1:46.06 outdoors (Oordegem-Lede 2015) and 1:47.89 indoor (Reims 2019).

Competition record

References

1988 births
Living people
Algerian male middle-distance runners
Place of birth missing (living people)
World Athletics Championships athletes for Algeria
21st-century Algerian people
20th-century Algerian people